The following is a list of chapters for the Japanese manga series Black Jack.  It was created by Osamu Tezuka and published in Akita Shoten's Weekly Shōnen Champion from November 19, 1973, to October 14, 1983.

Some of the manga chapters were published in English by Viz Media throughout Volume 3 Issue 9 to Volume 4 Issue 8 of their manga anthology magazine, Manga Vizion. It was later released as two graphic novels. Vertical, Inc. has acquired the license and will release the Black Jack episodes in the order that Tezuka indicated for the hardcover Akita "Deluxe Edition". The order is listed below.



Volume list

Chapters not collected in Akita Deluxe edition

Some chapters listed here were included with the hardcover editions of Vertical Inc.'s publication of Black Jack. These have been noted.

References

See also
Black Jack
List of Black Jack episodes
List of Osamu Tezuka manga

Black Jack
Black Jack (manga)